Ordeal is a 1980 autobiography by the former pornographic actress Linda Lovelace (real name: Linda Boreman), star of the film Deep Throat, a seminal 1972 film at the forefront of the Golden Age of Porn. In the autobiography, Lovelace recounts that she was raped during her career in the porn industry.

See also
 Anti-pornography movement
 Rape pornography

References

American autobiographies
Anti-pornography feminism
Books about rape
Non-fiction books about pornography
1980 non-fiction books
Kensington Books books